Olavio López Duque O.A.R. (February 6, 1932 – June 11, 2013) was a Colombian Roman Catholic bishop.

Ordained to the priesthood on October 30, 1955 for the Augustinian Recollects, López Duque was named titular bishop of Strongoli and Vicar Apostolic of Casanare on May 30, 1977 and was ordained bishop on August 7, 1977. He resigned when the Vicariate Apostolic of Casanare was suppressed and became part of the Roman Catholic Diocese of Yopal.

Notes

1932 births
2013 deaths
20th-century Roman Catholic bishops in Colombia
Augustinian Recollect bishops
Roman Catholic bishops of Yopal